Andrea Jones (born 1960) is a garden photographer and photographs around the world for magazines, newspapers and books.  She is based in Scotland.

Work
Jones has built up a reputation for her photographs of landscape architecture, gardens and plants, with the latter being the subject of her solo book Plantworlds (2005). She also illustrated Great Gardens of America (2009) which was written by Tim Richardson and published by Frances Lincoln. Her newest book is The Garden Source (2011).

Honours
Jones is a Fellow of the RSA.  In 2008/9 she was voted Photographer of the Year by her peers in the UK's Garden Media Guild.

Exhibitions
 RSA (London) solo exhibition of photography permanently on display from 1997 to 2005
 The Museum of Garden History, Lambeth Palace, London – Gardens with Soul (solo exhibition) October 1999
 Chanticleer, Pennsylvania, USA – Garden Exposures – exhibition of photographs taken at Chanticleer gardens with the sculptures of Alasdair Currie. July – September 2004
 The Old Course Hotel, St Andrews, Scotland – Art on the Links – solo exhibition  – Spring 2000
 The Hulton Getty Gallery, London –  Take Four August 2001. Exhibition of work along with two other photographers Nick Danziger and Ben Elwes
 Plantworks – exhibition of photography with fellow photographer Jonathan Buckley  – April 2003
 London Wetland Centre – May 2003 Solo exhibition of photography alongside the work of Sculptor Alasdair Currie

References

External links

1960 births
Living people
Place of birth missing (living people)
Scottish women photographers